Iyah Mina is a Filipino actress.

Career 

In 2009, Mina started working as a stand up comic in Punchline, where she would eventually meet Vice Ganda. Vice Ganda would later on cast Mina as one of her jesters/sidekicks in the late-night comedy talk show Gandang Gabi, Vice!.

In 2018, Mina appeared in the 2018 Cinema One Originals entry Mamu; And a Mother Too, playing an aging transgender sex worker forced to take the responsibility of being a mother to her sister’s orphaned transgender daughter, for which she awarded Best Actress in the Cinema One Originals Film Festival and became the first transgender to win such award in the said festival and the first transgender to win a Best Actress award in the Philippines. 

The following year, Mina appeared in Wagas Presents: Throwback Pag-ibig. 

In 2020, she appeared in the iWant miniseries  My Single Lady and appeared in the coming-of-age romantic drama The Boy Foretold by the Stars.

Filmography

Television

Film

Awards and nominations

References

External links
 

Living people
Filipino television actresses
Filipino film actresses
Year of birth missing (living people)